Meet the Family is Frenzal Rhomb's third studio album. It was released in September 1997. The album was the first with Lindsay McDougall on guitar and the last with Nat Nykruj on drums.

Track listing

Charts

Certifications

References

1997 albums
Frenzal Rhomb albums